Leonard Compton (26 March 1902 – after 1930) was an English professional footballer. A goalkeeper, he played in the Football League for Blackpool, Rochdale, Barnsley and Norwich City.

References

External links
Crompton plays for Barnsley in their FA Cup giantkilling act of Sheffield Wednesday in 1931

1902 births
Year of death missing
People from Tottington, Greater Manchester
English footballers
Association football goalkeepers
Rossendale United F.C. players
Blackpool F.C. players
Lancaster City F.C. players
Rochdale A.F.C. players
Barnsley F.C. players
Norwich City F.C. players
English Football League players